Vy bus4you, formerly Nettbuss Bus4You, is a Swedish long distance bus brand that began operations in 2007, in competition with Swebus Express. The service is operated by Vy Travel, a Swedish subsidiary of Norwegian bus operator Vy Buss.

Vy bus4you operates routes between Stockholm and Gothenburg with stops in Norrköping, Linköping, Mjölby, Jönköping, Borås and Landvetter Airport, between Oslo and Copenhagen with stops in Moss, Sarpsborg, Tanumshede, Uddevalla, Gothenburg, Helsingborg, Lund, Malmö and Kastrup Airport, between Oslo and Stockholm with stops in Karlstad, Karlskoga, Kristinehamn, Örebro, Västerås and Arlanda Airport, and between Ludvika and Arlanda Airport with stops in Smedjebacken, Söderbärke, Fagersta and Stockholm.

Between December 2011 and August 2015 Nettbuss in Norway also operated a Bus4You route between Sandnes, Stavanger, Haugesund and Bergen.

References

External links
Bus4you in Sweden

Vy Buss
Bus transport in Sweden
Bus routes in Norway
Swedish companies disestablished in 2007